William John Warner (also known as Count Louis Hamon according to some sources), popularly known as Cheiro (1 November 1866 – 8 October 1936), was an Irish astrologer and colorful occult figure of the early 20th century. His sobriquet, Cheiro, derives from the word cheiromancy, meaning palmistry. He was a self-described clairvoyant who said he learned palmistry, astrology, and Chaldean numerology in India. He was celebrated for using these forms of divination to make personal predictions for famous clients and to foresee world events.

Personal life and background
The son of William Warner and Margaret Thompson Warner, Cheiro was born William John Warner in the village of Rathdown, outside Dublin, Ireland. He took the name Count Louis Hamon (or Count Leigh de Hamong).

As mentioned in his memoirs, Cheiro acquired his expertise in India. As a teenager, he travelled to the Bombay port of Apollo Bunder. There, he met his guru, an Indian Chitpavan Brahmin, who took him to his village in the valley of the Konkan region of Maharashtra. Later Cheiro was permitted by Brahmans to study an ancient book that has many studies on hands. After studying thoroughly for two years, he returned to London and started his career as a palmist.

Cheiro was reluctant to marry but was aware that he was destined to marry late in life. This did happen after a woman took care of him during a serious illness. A separate chapter is devoted to this matter in his memoirs.

Career
Cheiro had a wide following of famous European and American clients during the late 19th and early 20th centuries. He read palms and told the fortunes of famous celebrities like Mark Twain, W. T. Stead, Sarah Bernhardt, Mata Hari, Oscar Wilde, Grover Cleveland, Thomas Edison, the Prince of Wales, General Kitchener, William Ewart Gladstone, and Joseph Chamberlain. He documented his sittings with these clients by asking them to sign a guest book he kept for the purpose, in which he encouraged them to comment on their experiences as subjects of his character analyses and predictions.  Of the Prince of Wales, he wrote that "I would not be surprised if he did not give up everything, including his right to be crowned, for the woman he loved."   Cheiro also predicted that the Jews would return to Palestine and the country would again be called Israel.

In his own autobiographical book, Cheiro's Memoirs: The Reminiscences of a Society Palmist, he included accounts of his interviews with King Edward VII, William Gladstone, Charles Stewart Parnell, Henry Morton Stanley, Sarah Bernhardt, Oscar Wilde, Professor Max Muller, Blanche Roosevelt, the Comte de Paris, Joseph Chamberlain, Lord Russell of Killowen, Robert Ingersoll, Ella Wheeler Wilcox, Lillie Langtry, W. T. Stead, Richard Croker, Natalia Janotha, and other prominent people of his era.

The book Titanic's Last Secrets includes a detailed account of one of Cheiro's palm readings with William Pirrie, chairman of Harland and Wolf, builders of the Titanic. Cheiro predicted that he would soon be in a fight for his life, talking about the battle surrounding the Titanic sinking.

So popular was Cheiro as a "society palmist" that even those who were not believers in the occult had their hands read by him. The skeptical Mark Twain wrote in Cheiro's visitor's book:

Other mentions in the visitors book include:

"The study of people gifted with occult powers has interested me for several years. I have met and consulted scores. In almost ever respect I consider Cheiro the most highly gifted of all. He helps as well as astonishes." - Ella Wheeler Wilcox.

"You are wonderful. What more can I say" - Madame Nellie Melba.

Death
After some years in London, and many world travels, Cheiro moved to America. He spent his final years in Hollywood, seeing as many as twenty clients a day and doing some screenwriting before his death there in 1936 following a heart attack.

From Time magazine of 19 October 1936:
Died. Count Louis Hamon ("Cheiro"), 69, celebrated oldtime palmist; after long illness; in Hollywood. Author of a book on palmistry at 13, he amassed $250,000 from rich female clients, owned an English-language newspaper in Paris, The American Register. On the night he died, said his nurse, the clock outside his room struck the hour of one thrice.

His widow, the Countess Lena Hamon, said her 70-year-old husband, who had been a friend and adviser to film actors late in life, and to European aristocracy and royalty in his early career, had predicted his own death to the hour the day before he died.

Bibliography
The occult books Cheiro wrote centred on fortune telling. Many of Cheiro's books on occultism and fortune telling are still in print today and are available in both English and foreign language editions.

In 2006, the University of Tampa Press issued a critical new edition of his fictional work, A Study of Destiny, as the second volume of the series Insistent Visions – a series dedicated to reprinting little-known or neglected works of supernatural fiction, science fiction, mysteries, or adventure stories from the 19th century.
The new edition is edited with an introduction, afterword, and notes by Sean Donnelly.

Numerology
 Cheiro's Book of Numbers

Palmistry
 Cheiro's Language of the Hand (first self-published in 1894)
 Cheiro's Guide to the Hand
 You and Your Hand
 Cheiro's Palmistry for All
 The Cheiro Book of Fate and Fortune
 Cheiro's Complete Palmistry

Astrology
 When were you Born?
 Cheiro's You and Your Star: The Book of the Zodiac
 Cheiro's Book of World Predictions
 Cheiro's Memoirs: Reminiscences of a Society Palmist
 Titanic's Last Secrets
 True Ghost Stories (attested tales of paranormal experiences)

Fiction
 A Study of Destiny (also published as The Hand of Fate, first released in 1898)

References

External links
 
 
 
 

 

 
1866 births
1936 deaths
19th-century astrologers
20th-century astrologers
American astrologers
American astrological writers
American male non-fiction writers
American occult writers
New Age spiritual leaders
Irish emigrants to the United States
Irish astrologers
Irish occult writers
Clairvoyants
19th-century American male writers
20th-century American non-fiction writers
20th-century American male writers
Palmists